Give 'Em Hell, Malone is a 2009 American neo-noir action crime thriller film directed by Russell Mulcahy and starring Thomas Jane, Ving Rhames and Elsa Pataky.

Plot
An ex-private eye turned gun for hire named Malone is hired to retrieve a suitcase from a building full of armed mobsters, but a violent shootout ensues and Malone is eventually left as the only survivor.  Suspecting a set-up, he retains the only noteworthy item contained in the case - a small painted animal referred to as "the meaning of love" -  for himself, prompting several different parties in the employ of a local gangster - Whitmore - to pursue Malone in attempt to discern the meaning of the case's contents.

After a series of violent encounters leaving many dead, Malone eventually confronts Whitmore, who admits he was responsible for hiring Malone and planted the toy - a keepsake belonging to Malone's young son - as a means to trick Malone into exterminating Whitmore's criminal help, allowing Whitmore to become a legitimate businessman without worrying about being tainted by potential loose ends from his criminal past.  Malone kills Whitmore and phones his (Malone's) wife and son - previously presumed dead - but does not engage them in conversation.

A title-over at the end reads, "To Be Continued..." but no sequel occurred.

Cast
 Thomas Jane as Malone
 Ving Rhames as "Boulder"
 Elsa Pataky as Evelyn
 French Stewart as Frankie "The Crooner"
 Leland Orser as Murphy
 Chris Yen as "Mauler"
 William Abadie as "Pretty Boy"
 Gregory Harrison as Whitmore
 Doug Hutchison as "Matchstick"

Release
The film was released on DVD and Blu-ray January 26, 2010.

References

External links
 
 

2009 films
2000s English-language films
2009 action thriller films
2009 crime thriller films
American action thriller films
American crime thriller films
Films set in the 1960s
Films directed by Russell Mulcahy
American neo-noir films
Films produced by Brian Oliver
2000s American films